Matthew Dean Karchner (born June 28, 1967) is a former professional baseball player who pitched in the Major Leagues from 1995 to 2000.

Playing career
Karchner graduated from Berwick High School in Berwick, Pennsylvania in 1985. He played college baseball as a third baseman at Bloomsburg University and led NCAA Division II with 1.59 runs batted in per game in 1988.

The following year, he was selected in the eighth round of the 1989 Major League Baseball draft by the Kansas City Royals. He was converted to pitching and was assigned to the Eugene Emeralds of the Northwest League to begin his professional career. 

After three seasons in the Royals' farm system, Karchner was selected in the 1991 Rule 5 draft by the Montreal Expos. He signed a one-year contract with the Expos in January 1992 but was returned to the Royals that April.

Karchner spent two more seasons in the Royals' farm system before being selected by the Chicago White Sox in the minor league phase of the 1993 Rule 5 draft. To begin the 1994 season, Karchner was assigned to the Birmingham Barons where he played with Michael Jordan. Karchner made his Major League debut on July 18, 1995 at Yankee Stadium and pitched a scoreless inning in relief of Kirk McCaskill. Karchner was a regular in the White Sox bullpen for the remainder of that season as well as the following two seasons. Between 1997 and 1998, he set a franchise record by converting 20 consecutive save opportunities.

On July 29, 1998, Karchner was traded to the Chicago Cubs for Jon Garland who was then 18 years old and struggling in the minor leagues. The move was widely criticized by prospect experts at the time and was later described in the Chicago Tribune as "one of the most lopsided in [Cubs] franchise history" and in The Athletic as the "greatest White Sox trade ever." Karchner struggled in his debut season with the Cubs but was brought back the following year nonetheless. In 1999, he missed substantial time due to groin injuries. By 2000, Karchner's attitude had soured and manager Don Baylor chose to keep him in the minors with the Iowa Cubs due, according to Karchner, to his negative attitude. The Cubs released him in September 2000. Needing offseason shoulder surgery and facing free agency, Karchner chose to retire.

Karchner later told Mitchell Report investigators that, during spring training in 1999, he was present when two of his Cubs teammates injected each other with steroids in their shared apartment. He further reported that he had been offered steroids but declined to use them.

Coaching career
In January 2004, Karchner was named the interim head baseball coach at Susquehanna University. He resigned that position in June 2005.

Personal life
Karchner's wife gave birth to their daughter, Emma, on April 1, 1994. By the time his playing career ended, he had multiple children.

, Karchner lived in Berwick, Pennsylvania.

References

External links

1967 births
Living people
Appleton Foxes players
Baseball City Royals players
Baseball players from Pennsylvania
Birmingham Barons players
Bloomsburg Huskies baseball players
Chicago Cubs players
Chicago White Sox players
Eugene Emeralds players
Iowa Cubs players
Major League Baseball pitchers
Memphis Chicks players
Nashville Sounds players
People from Berwick, Pennsylvania
Susquehanna River Hawks baseball coaches